ONR may refer to:

 Obóz Narodowo-Radykalny, three far-right fascist Polish nationalist organisations known as National Radical Camp
 Office for Nuclear Regulation in the United Kingdom
 Office of Naval Research of the U.S. Navy
 ON-Regel, a standard by the Austrian Standards International
 ONR, the ICAO airline code for Air One Nine Company, Libya
 ONR., stage name of Scottish singer Robert Shields
 Ontario Northland Railway in Ontario, Canada
 Organisation for National Reconstruction, a defunct political party in Trinidad and Tobago
 Otter Nelson River School, a high school in Manitoba, Canada